James Wade Bonnici (born January 21, 1972 in Omaha, Nebraska) is an American former professional baseball player. At his highest level he played for the Orix BlueWave in the Japan Pacific League.

References

Orix BlueWave players
Living people
1972 births
Sportspeople from Omaha, Nebraska
Arizona League Mariners players
Bellingham Mariners players
Riverside Pilots players
Port City Roosters players
Tacoma Rainiers players
Toledo Mud Hens players
Baseball players from Michigan
Baseball players from Nebraska
Nippon Professional Baseball first basemen